Folketing elections were held in Denmark on 20 May 1910. The result was a victory for Venstre, which won 57 of the 114 seats. Voter turnout was 74.8%.

Results

References

Elections in Denmark
Denmark
Folketing election
Denmark